This is a list of Minnesota trees, both native and introduced, organized by scientific name.

A
 Abies balsamea (balsam fir; native)
 Acer ginnala (Amur maple; introduced from Asia)
 Acer negundo (boxelder; native)
 Acer nigrum (black maple; native)
 Acer platanoides (Norway maple; introduced from Eurasia)
 Acer rubrum (red maple; native)
 Acer saccharinum (silver maple; native)
 Acer saccharum (sugar maple; native)
 Acer spicatum (mountain maple; native)
 Aesculus hippocastanum (European horsechestnut; introduced from Europe)
 Aesculus glabra (Ohio buckeye; introduced from the eastern United States)

B
 Betula alleghaniensis (yellow birch; native)
 Betula nigra (river birch; native)
 Betula papyrifera (paper birch; native)

C
 Carpinus caroliniana (American hornbeam, blue beech, ironwood; native)
 Carya cordiformis (bitternut hickory; native)
 Carya ovata (shagbark hickory; native)
 Celtis occidentalis (hackberry; native)

E
 Elaeagnus angustifolia (Russian olive; introduced from Asia)

F
 Frangula alnus (glossy buckthorn, alder buckthorn; introduced from Eurasia)
 Fraxinus americana (white ash; native)
 Fraxinus nigra (black ash; native)
 Fraxinus pennsylvanica var. pennsylvanica (red ash; native)
 Fraxinus pennsylvanica var. lanceolata (green ash; native)

G
 Gleditsia triacanthos (honey locust; native)
 Gymnocladus dioicus (Kentucky coffeetree; native)

J
 Juglans cinerea (butternut; native)
 Juglans nigra (black walnut; native)
 Juniperus virginiana (eastern juniper, red cedar; native)

L
 Larix laricina (tamarack, eastern larch; native)

M
 Morus rubra (red mulberry; native)

O
 Ostrya virginiana (ironwood, hophornbeam)

P
 Pinus banksiana (jack pine; native)
 Pinus resinosa (red pine, Norway pine; native)
 Pinus strobus (white pine; native)
 Pinus sylvestris (Scots pine; introduced from Eurasia)
 Picea abies (Norway spruce; introduced from Eurasia)
 Picea glauca (white spruce; native)
 Picea mariana (black spruce; native)
 Populus alba (white poplar; introduced from Eurasia)
 Populus balsamifera (balsam poplar; native)
 Populus deltoides (eastern cottonwood; native)
 Populus grandidentata (bigtooth aspen; native)
 Populus tremuloides (quaking aspen; native)
 Prunus pensylvanica (pin cherry; native)
 Prunus serotina (black cherry; native)
 Prunus virginiana (chokecherry; native)

Q
 Quercus alba (white oak; native)
 Quercus macrocarpa (bur oak; native)
 Quercus bicolor (swamp white oak; native)
 Quercus prinus (chestnut oak; native)
 Quercus muehlenbergii (chinkapin oak; native)
 Quercus rubra (northern red oak; native)
 Quercus velutina (black oak; native)
 Quercus ellipsoidalis (northern pin oak; native)

R
 Rhamnus cathartica (common buckthorn; introduced from Eurasia)
 Rhamnus frangula; see Frangula alnus
 Robinia pseudoacacia (black locust; introduced from the eastern United States)

S
 Salix amygdaloides (peachleaf willow; native)
 Salix nigra (black willow; native)
 Sorbus americana (American mountain ash; native)
 Sorbus decora (showy rowan; native)

T
 Tilia americana (basswood; native)
 Thuja occidentalis (eastern arborvitae, white cedar; native)
 Tsuga canadensis (eastern hemlock; native)

U
 Ulmus americana (American elm; native)
 Ulmus rubra (slippery elm; native)
 Ulmus pumila (Siberian elm; introduced from Asia)
 Ulmus thomasii (rock elm; native)

See also
 Lists of Minnesota trees

Trees
Lists of trees
Trees of the North-Central United States
Trees of the Great Lakes region (North America)